Peng Rui (born 30 August 1993) is a Chinese footballer who plays for Quanzhou Yassin.

Club career 
Peng Rui started his professional football career in 2013 when he was promoted to China League One side Chongqing Lifan's first team squad. On 13 May 2015, he made his senior debut in a 2–1 away win against Dalian Aerbin in the 2015 Chinese FA Cup, coming on as a substitute for Feng Jing in the stoppage time. Failing to establish himself within the team, Peng was linked with Qingdao Hainiu after the 2015 season.

Peng was loaned to China League Two club Chengdu Qbao for one season in March 2016. He made his debut for the club on 20 March 2016 in a 3–0 home win over amateur club Dalian Shengwei in the 2016 Chinese FA Cup. On 21 May 2016, he scored his first senior goal in a 2–1 home win against Sichuan Longfor in the Sichuan Derby. Peng scored two goals in 19 league appearances in the 2016 season. On 6 March 2017, he made a permanent transfer to Chengdu Qbao. 

On 28 February 2018, Peng joined Chinese Super League side Tianjin TEDA. On 25 April 2018, he made his debut for Tianjin in the 2018 Chinese FA Cup against Wuhan Zall which Tianjin TEDA eventually won in the penalty shootout. He made his Super League debut on 6 May 2018 in a 5–1 away win over Guizhou Hengfeng, coming on as a substitute for Yang Fan in the 80th minute.

Career statistics

References

External links
 

1996 births
Living people
Chinese footballers
People from Mianyang
Footballers from Sichuan
Chongqing Liangjiang Athletic F.C. players
Tianjin Jinmen Tiger F.C. players
Chinese Super League players
China League One players
China League Two players
Association football defenders